3-Song EP is a twelve-inch EP by Royal Trux. It was released by Drag City in 1998.

Track listing

References

Royal Trux albums
1998 EPs
Drag City (record label) EPs
Domino Recording Company EPs